Cikobia-i-Lau, or Cirikalia, is an island in the Lau Islands in the north-east of Fiji. The island has historically been called Thikombia, Thimkombia-i-Lau or Farewell Island.

Environment 
In the Quaternary period, Cikobia-i-Lau was one of the most seismically active islands in Fiji. In 1976 white-tailed tropic birds were using the islands cliffs as nest sites. The island is forested, has one village, as well as some caves, cliffs and gardens.

In 2016 Cyclone Winston damaged the island and its infrastructure, and repairs supported by the Fijian and New Zealand governments began in March.

Society 
In 1982 Cikobiai-Lau's islanders rescued a Californian family who had spent 25 days adrift before being stranded on a sand bar close to the island.

Notable people 
In 2016 the head man was Ledua Sele.

Gallery

Notes

References

Islands of Fiji
Vanua Levu